Zing or ZING may refer to:

Zing (model-checker), infrastructure for verification of concurrent software via model checking
Zing (punctuation) or irony punctuation, invented by English printer Henry Denham in the 1580s
Zing (quartet), the 2010 Sweet Adelines International champion quartet
Zing (TV channel), an Indian music TV channel
Zing, Nigeria, a Local Government Area of Taraba State
Zing JVM, a Java virtual machine by Azul Systems
Zing Technologies, a company that makes collaborative team learning and meeting systems
Pop's Props Zing, ultralight aircraft
Zing.vn, the portal of VinaGame company
ZING (Z39.50), a client–server protocol
Zing, a toy company most known for Wet Head and Stikbot
Zing, a term for love at first sight in the Hotel Transylvania film series
Zing, a former business, merged into Micromania-Zing, a French videogaming retail company
ZiNG Pop Culture Australia, an Australian pop culture store owned by EB Games Australia

People
Steve Zing (born 1964), American drummer
Zing-Yang Kuo (1898–1970), Chinese experimental and physiological psychologist
Zing Tsjeng (born 1988), Singaporean writer based in London

See also
 The Legendary Zing Album, a 1972 album by the Trammps
 "Zing a Little Zong", a popular song from the 1952 movie Just for You
 Zing It, an audio game
 Cherry Zing
 Lemon Lime Zing